The Ball Hockey World Championship is a biannual ball (street) hockey competition for women's and men's national teams. The first women's world championships were played in 2005, located in Pittsburgh, PA. The first championship was played in 1996 in Bratislava. Since the beginning of the best teams in Canada, the Czech Republic and Slovakia. The first team to win a medal in addition to Canada, the Czech Republic and Slovakia, the team of Italy in 2005 when he won the bronze medal match against Portugal. Since 1999 championship played every two years. Ball Hockey World Championship is organized by ISBHF.

Summary

Men

Key

Medal table

Participation details

Women

Medal table

Participation details

References 
 ISBHF Official Site
 Men's World Championships
 Women's World Championships

 
Ball hockey
Ball